Czerwonak  is a village in Poznań County, Greater Poland Voivodeship, in west-central Poland. It is the seat of the gmina (administrative district) called Gmina Czerwonak.

In 2006 Czerwonak had a population of 5,432. The village of Koziegłowy, which borders Czerwonak to the south, has an even larger population.

Czerwonak adjoins the protected forest area known as Puszcza Zielonka Landscape Park.

References

Czerwonak